Paul Griffin may refer to:

 Paul Griffin (basketball) (born 1954), American basketball player
 Paul Griffin (boxer) (born 1971), Irish boxer
 Paul Griffin (Gaelic footballer)
 Paul Griffin (musician) (1937–2000), pianist
 Paul Griffin (rower) (born 1979), Irish rower
 Paul Griffin (cyclist) in RTS-Santic Racing Team
 Paul A. Griffin, co-editor of Accounting Horizons

See also 
 Griffin (surname)